Radiopostaja Čapljina  or Radio Čapljina is a Herzegovinan local public radio station, broadcasting from Čapljina, Bosnia and Herzegovina.

Estimated number of potential listeners is around 95,246.

Radio Čapljina was launched on 26 October 1976 by the municipal council of Čapljina. In Yugoslavia and in SR Bosnia and Herzegovina, it was part of local/municipal Radio Sarajevo network affiliate. Program is mainly produced in Croatian. This radio station broadcasts a variety of programs such as music, local news and talk shows. Due to the favorable geographical position in Herzegovina region, this radiostation is also available in neighboring Croatia.

Frequencies
 Čapljina

See also 
List of radio stations in Bosnia and Herzegovina

References

External links 
 www.radio-capljina.com
 Communications Regulatory Agency of Bosnia and Herzegovina

Čapljina
Radio stations established in 1976